Showtime is a 2002 American buddy cop  action comedy film directed by Tom Dey. The film stars Robert De Niro and Eddie Murphy in the lead roles alongside Rene Russo, William Shatner, Pedro Damian and De Niro's real life daughter Drena De Niro. The film was released in the United States on March 15, 2002. The film received generally negative reviews, with critics lamenting its lackluster humour and poor attempt to satirize the buddy cop genre. It received two nominations at the 23rd Golden Raspberry Awards: Worst Actor (for Murphy), and Worst Screen Combo (for Murphy and DeNiro).

Plot
Two LAPD cops, Detective Mitch Preston and Officer Trey Sellars, both from the Central Division, are paired for a reality police show and run into real trouble with a crime lord. Mitch shoots a news camera after a failed confrontation local drug dealer Lazy Boy, who escapes by using a custom-built gun. Maxxis Television, the fictional network that employed the cameraman, decides to sue the police department for $10 million, but will drop the lawsuit if Mitch agrees to star in a reality cop television show, which Trey later calls Showtime!.

Trey enters the picture shortly after, as an LAPD officer who actually wants to be an actor while also trying to become a detective. He pays a friend to snatch the purse of the show's producer, Chase Renzi, and then retrieves it after a staged fight scene. Even though the deception is embarrassingly revealed, Chase is impressed and signs Trey on anyway. It is quickly revealed that the show's producers have little interest in filming an actual police officer's existence; they build a mini-movie set in the middle of the station, and replace Mitch's nondescript personal car with a Humvee, while Trey drives a C5 Corvette. They also hire William Shatner (who once played T. J. Hooker) to give both men tips on how to act; while Trey is eager to learn, Mitch is merely annoyed.

Despite all this, Mitch tries to investigate the mysterious supergun, which is subsequently used by arms dealer Caesar Vargas to kill the drug dealer and his girlfriend. Through a clever ruse by Trey, they are able to get the arms dealer's name from Re-Run, the dead dealer's henchman. However, Vargas is less than cooperative, which causes a brawl at his nightclub. Trey and Mitch are able to defeat him and his henchmen, and subsequently have a relatively friendly conversation on their way home. However, Mitch's good humor evaporates when he finds that, in his absence, the Showtime producers have drastically remodeled his house and given him a retired K-9 dog as a pet.

Vargas and his crew assault an armored car and kill the crew, then devastate the police who respond. Trey and Mitch arrive and are pulled into the shootout. When the attackers flee in a garbage truck, Mitch gives chase in a police car. In the ensuing mayhem, the car is rammed by the garbage truck, which winds up crashing into a construction site. Mitch survives by jumping from the police car to Trey's sports car (he had previously denounced "hood-jumping" as a useless skill). In the wake of the disaster, the police chief pulls the plug on the show, suspends Mitch from duty and demotes Trey back to patrol.

With the show ended, Mitch's car is returned and his apartment restored (but he refuses to return the dog, of which he has grown fond). While watching the final episode, Mitch calls Trey and apologizes for his actions and even offers him to help ask questions on the detective exam. But while doing so, Mitch sees one of his police colleagues at Vargas's nightclub. He and Trey investigate, finding that Vargas is selling the weapons at a gun show at the Bonaventure Hotel. Vargas flees with one of the weapons, taking Chase hostage in the process. The duo is able to rescue her, via a pocket pistol concealed in a Maxxis camera, but the ceiling of the room is shot. It is located just below the pool, so it floods, and Vargas is washed out the window to his death, Trey manages to save himself and Mitch by handcuffing them together. They wind up suspended from a broken beam outside the hotel.

Trey is promoted to detective, and he and Mitch are now partners and still working together with a new case, and there are hints of a romance between Chase and Mitch. Showtime is revived and in its second season, this time with two young and attractive female officers, who are just as antagonistic as Mitch and Trey were.

Cast
 Robert De Niro as Detective Mitch Preston
 Eddie Murphy as Officer Trey Sellars
 Rene Russo as Chase Renzi
 Pedro Damian as Cesar Vargas
 Mos Def as 'Lazy Boy'
 Frankie R. Faison as Captain Winship
 William Shatner as himself
 Nestor Serrano as Ray
 Drena De Niro as Annie
 Linda Hart as Waitress
 TJ Cross as 'Re-Run'
 Judah Friedlander as Julio
 Kadeem Hardison as Kylee
 Peter Jacobson as Brad Slocum
 Ken Campbell as Cop in Gym
 John Cariani as Charlie Hertz
 James Roday as Showtime Cameraman
 Rachael Harris as Teacher
 Alex Borstein as Casting Director
 Marshall Manesh as Convenience Store Owner
 Johnnie Cochran as himself
 Joy Bryant as Lexi
 Maurice Compte as Chili
 Freez Luv as Freez
 Merlin Santana as Hector
 Julian Dulce Vida as J.J.
 Angela Alvarado as Gina Reyes (as Angela Rose Alvarado)
 Larry Joe Campbell as Locker Room Cop #2
 Henry Kingi as Garbage Truck Driver

Soundtrack

Track list
 "Caramel" – performed by Alias Project [3:27]
 "Why" – performed by Rude [3:33]
 "Mr. Lover" – performed by Shaggy [3:55]
 "My Bad" – performed by Rayvon [3:29]
 "Lie Till I Die" – performed by Marsha Morrison [4:52]
 "Man Ah Bad Man" – performed by T.O.K. [2:54]
 "Money Jane" – performed by Baby Blue Soundcrew [4:19]
 "Your Eyes" – performed by Rik Rok [4:00]
 "Fly Away" – performed by Gordon Dukes [4:00]
 "Swingin'" – performed by Shaggy [3:10]
 "Get the Cash" – performed by Howzing [3:45]
 "Still the One" – performed by Prince Mydas [3:25]
 "Showtime" – performed by Shaggy [4:31]

Reception

Critical response 
On Rotten Tomatoes the film holds an approval rating of 25% based on 123 reviews, with an average rating of 4.7/10. The site's critics consensus reads, "Showtime starts out as a promising satire of the buddy cop genre. Unfortunately, it ends up becoming the type of movies it is satirizing." On Metacritic the film has a weighted average score of 32 out of 100, based on 34 critics, indicating "generally unfavorable reviews". Audiences polled by CinemaScore gave the film an average grade of "B–" on an A+ to F scale.

The film was nominated for two Razzie Awards, for Worst Actor (Eddie Murphy) and Worst Screen Couple (Murphy and Robert De Niro).

Box office
Showtime grossed $38.1 million in the United States and Canada, and $39.7 million in other territories, for a worldwide total of $77.7 million, against a production budget of $85 million.

References

External links

 
 
 

2002 films
2002 action comedy films
2002 comedy films
2000s buddy cop films
2000s chase films
2000s English-language films
2000s police comedy films
American action comedy films
American buddy cop films
American buddy comedy films
American chase films
American police detective films
Films about dogs
Films about drugs
Films about the Los Angeles Police Department
Films about television
Films directed by Tom Dey
Films scored by Alan Silvestri
Films set in Los Angeles
Films shot in Los Angeles
Village Roadshow Pictures films
Warner Bros. films
2000s American films